Bradd Shore (born June 14, 1945) is an American cultural anthropologist who is best known as a leading authority on Samoan culture and a foundational theorist of the cultural models school of cognitive and psychological anthropology.  He is the Goodrich C. White Professor Emeritus of Anthropology at Emory University and is a former Department Chair. He is the former Director of the Emory Center for Myth and Ritual in American Life and is also a past President of the Society for Psychological Anthropology.

His 1996 monograph Culture in Mind: Cognition, Culture and the Problem of Meaning was among the first studies to link multiculturalism to cognitive psychology, and was an effort to reformulate a conception of culture that could bridge the fields of anthropology and the cognitive sciences. It has become a keystone text in the field of cognitive anthropology. Shore's graduate research was done in Western Samoa and was focused on the local modeling of personhood and selfhood –  with an emphasis on ethics, conflict and social control. It resulted in his first book, Sala’ilua: A Samoan Mystery (1982), considered one of the earliest studies of ethnopsychology.  He has authored dozens of scholarly articles and chapters published in numerous Journals and edited books. His most recent book is Shakespeare and Social Theory: The Play of Great Ideas (2021), which seeks to use an anthropological lens to build a bridge between Shakespeare studies and classical social theory. He has also produced and directed a documentary film Family Revival: Salem Camp Meeting.

Shore received his B.A. from the University of California at Berkeley, and his Ph.D. in Anthropology from the University of Chicago, where he studied with Marshall Sahlins and David M. Schneider.

Books

· Shakespeare and Social Theory: The Play of Great Ideas (2021).
· What Culture Means, How Culture Means (The Heinz Werner Lectures)  (1998).  
· Culture in Mind: Cognition, Culture and the Problem of Meaning (1996).
· Sala’ilua: A Samoan Mystery (1982).
· New Neighbors: Pacific Islander Migration in Adaptation (1978) (Edited, with C. MacPherson and R. Franco).

Awards and Positions

Shore is the winner of the Emory Williams Teaching Award, Emory’s highest award for teaching. He was the first holder of the Emory College Distinguished Teaching Professorship in the Sciences and Social Sciences.

He is a former Fellow (1988–89) at the Center for Advanced Study in the Behavioral Sciences in Palo Alto, California.

Notes

1945 births
Living people
American anthropologists
American cognitive scientists
Psychological anthropologists
Emory University faculty
University of Chicago alumni
Center for Advanced Study in the Behavioral Sciences fellows